Joseph Slogan (born 15 February 1931 at Windsor, Ontario) was a Progressive Conservative party member of the House of Commons of Canada. He was a dentist by career.

He was first elected at Manitoba's Springfield riding in the 1958 general election after an unsuccessful attempt to win the riding in 1953. Slogan was re-elected there in 1962 and 1963, then defeated in the 1965 election by Edward Schreyer of the New Democratic Party.

External links
 

1931 births
Canadian dentists
Living people
Members of the House of Commons of Canada from Manitoba
Politicians from Windsor, Ontario
Progressive Conservative Party of Canada MPs